I Can Do That is a 2015 American entertainment television series that ran on NBC. It premiered on May 26, 2015, and was broadcast at 10 PM on Tuesday nights. The show was hosted by comedian and actor Marlon Wayans. It was cancelled after one season. Nicole Scherzinger was the winner of the first season.

I Can Do That is based on the original format of the same name, launched by Israeli company Armoza Formats. The format has appeared in over 20 other countries. The show's theme song is "Can You Do This" by Aloe Blacc.

Overview
Six entertainers attempt to perform the acts of notable entertainers in various fields (singing, dancing, acrobatics, magic, etc.), with help from the original performers. The public votes on which was the best re-enacted act each week; the first-place finisher(s) get three points, second place gets two points, and third place gets one point. At the end of six weeks, the celebrity with the most points earns a trophy and the title of "The Greatest Entertainer". On July 2, 2015, NBC renewed the series for a second season.

Contestants
Nicole Scherzinger, singer, lead singer of The Pussycat Dolls, dancer, and actress
Cheryl Burke, dancer, and choreographer on Dancing with the Stars
Ciara, singer, dancer, and actress
Jeff Dye, stand-up comedian from Last Comic Standing 6
Joe Jonas, lead singer of the Jonas Brothers and DNCE, and actor
Alan Ritchson, actor and singer

Episodes

Scoreboard

International versions

Notes
 Both Jeff & Nicole's and Joe & Alan's acts received the same number of audience votes, so both placed second in Week 3 and received two points.
 All six celebrities were divided into two teams of three for one final performance consisting of all the performances done over the course of the competition. The team of three that received the most audience votes, won three extra points. The team of Nicole, Joe & Alan was revealed to have the most votes and received three points, while the team of Cheryl, Jeff & Ciara received 0 points.

References

External links

Format website

2015 American television series debuts
2010s American reality television series
2010s American variety television series
NBC original programming
Television series by Universal Television
American television series based on Israeli television series
2015 American television series endings